The Nova Scotia Curling Association (NSCA) is the regional governing body for the sport of curling in Nova Scotia. The organization is one of 14 regional associations within Curling Canada and as such determines who will represent the province in national championships.

Provincial championships 
Each year the NSCA hosts 11 provincial championships:

 Deloitte Tankard (men's)
 Nova Scotia Scotties Tournament of Hearts (women's)
 U21 Women's
 U21 Men's
 Mixed
 Senior Women's
 Senior Men's
 U18 Women's
 U18 Men's
 Wheelchair
 Mixed Doubles

See also 

 List of curling clubs in Nova Scotia

References

External links 

 Official website

Curling in Nova Scotia
Curling governing bodies in Canada